The Café de Paris is a coffeehouse and restaurant in the Belle Époque style of the 1900s, located in Monte Carlo and next to the Casino de Monte-Carlo, on the Place du Casino, facing the Hôtel de Paris. It is owned and managed by the Société des bains de mer de Monaco.

History

Founded in 1868, at the same time as Monte Carlo, with its Casino de Monte-Carlo and the Hôtel de Paris by François Blanc and Prince Charles III of Monaco, it was originally baptized Café Divan. It was transformed several times until the 1930s, then completely renovated in 1988 in the Belle Époque style of the 1900s like the old Parisian bistros.

References

External links

1868 establishments in Monaco
Monte Carlo
Coffeehouses and cafés
Restaurants in Monaco
Belle Époque